Granny Creek is a stream in Bollinger and 
Cape Girardeau counties in the U.S. state of Missouri. It is a tributary of Hog Creek.

The stream headwaters are in Cape Girardeau County about two miles southwest of Gravel Hill on Missouri Route 34 and just east of the county line. The stream flows south-southwest into Bollinger County and continues to the south roughly parallel to the county line. The confluence with Hog Creek is about 1.5 mile northwest of Lake Girardeau and the village of Crump.

The name "granny" is said to refer to a type of fish.

See also
List of rivers of Missouri

References

Rivers of Bollinger County, Missouri
Rivers of Cape Girardeau County, Missouri
Rivers of Missouri